The Berkshire League is a 9-team athletic conference of high schools, located in Litchfield County, Connecticut.

The Berkshire League is a member of the Connecticut Interscholastic Athletic Conference (CIAC).

Teams 

The Berkshire League is made up of nine member schools from around Litchfield County. The schools tend to be smaller regional schools and the league encompasses all public schools from the county with the exception of New Milford High School, Torrington High School and Watertown High School.

Lewis S. Mills High School was a member until the 2019-2020 season, when they decided to join the Central Connecticut Conference due to concerns about declining enrollment and sports-participation at the other schools.

Coop sports
For football, a majority of the Berkshire leagues schools compete as co-ops to field a team. Northwest United consists of Nonnewaug, Oliver Wolcott Technical, Litchfield, and Wamogo high schools. Gilbert, Northwesten, and Housatonic (shortened simply to GNH) are coached by Scott Salius and play in the Naugatuck Valley League beginning in fall 2022. In ice hockey, Shepaug Valley, Litchfield, Nonnewaug and Thomaston compete as a co-op. Housatonic Regional, Northwestern, Torrington and Wamogo compete as the other co-op.

Berkshire League Member Schools

Former members

Sports 

The Berkshire League offers varsity sports in three seasons: fall, winter, and spring.

Fall sports
 Girls' volleyball
 Boys' soccer
 Girls' soccer
 Boys' cross country
 Girls' cross country
 Girls' Field Hockey

Winter sports
 Boys' basketball
 Girls' basketball
 Girls' swimming
 Boys' swimming

Spring sports
 Baseball
 Softball
 Boys' outdoor track
 Girls' outdoor track
 Boys' tennis
 Girls' tennis
 Golf

Notable Alumni 

Evan Scribner 

Dominic Dao 

Dimmy Tonovan 

Daniel Dieck 

Cody Dzis 

Hunter Martocchio

Footnotes

External links 
 CIAC Website

Education in Connecticut
Education in Litchfield County, Connecticut
High school sports conferences and leagues in the United States
Sports in Connecticut